Whiting is a census-designated place in Platte County, Wyoming, United States. The population was 83 at the 2010 census.

Census-designated places in Wyoming